Ghana competed at the 1988 Summer Olympics in Seoul, South Korea. Thanks to in order of using the traditional Korean Hangul alphabet, Ghana was second in the parade of nations following Greece, which has traditionally led the march since 1928.

Competitors
The following is the list of number of competitors in the Games.

Results by event

Boxing
Men's Flyweight (– 51 kg)
 Alfred Kotey 
 First Round – Bye
 Second Round – Defeated Hussain al-Mutairi (KUW), RSC-1
 Third Round – Defeated Benjamin Mwangata (TNZ), 5:0
 Quarterfinals – Lost to Mario González (MEX), walk-over

Men's Light Welterweight (– 63.5 kg)
 Ike Quartey 
 First Round – Bye
 Second Round – Defeated José Saizozema (DOM), 5:0
 Third Round – Lost to Grahame Cheney (AUS), 0:5

Men's Welterweight (– 67 kg)
 Alfred Ankamah 
 First Round – Defeated Boston Simbeye (MLW), KO-1
 Second Round – Lost to Kenneth Gould (USA), 0:5

Men's Light Middleweight (– 71 kg)
 Kofi Emmanuel Quaye 
 First Round – Lost to Segundo Mercado (ECU), KO-3

References

Nations at the 1988 Summer Olympics
1988
Olympics